Eduard Gustav Honrath (11 August 1837, in Coblenz – 19 April 1893, in Berlin) was a German entomologist who specialised in Lepidoptera, particularly Parnassius.

Honrath was a well-known art dealer in Berlin. Among his entomological achievements, he described Parnassius graeseri (1885) (now Parnassius bremeri graeseri (a subspecies), Parnassius stenosemus and Papilio neumoegeni (both 1890) in the Berliner Entomologische Zeitschrift. He was a member of the Entomological Society of Berlin, and its president for many years.

References
Benezit Dictionary of Artists (in French, Bénézit Dictionnaire des peintres, sculpteurs, dessinateurs et graveurs) Éditions Gründ, Paris.(1911).
Anonym 1893 [Honrath, E. G.] Insektenbörse 10: 82.

External links
 portrait, further references.

German lepidopterists
1837 births
1893 deaths
Scientists from Koblenz
German art dealers